The Bratschenköpfe, consisting of the Großer Bratschenkopf and Kleiner Bratschenkopf, are two peaks in the Hochkönig massif in the Berchtesgaden Alps. The lie in the district of St. Johann im Pongau in the Austrian state of Salzburg.

The Großer Bratschenkopf may be climbed on a trackless route from the north from the crossing between the Arthurhaus and the Matrashaus (grade: easy). The Kleiner Bratschenkopf to the east may be reached from the same route (grade I).

Across the south face of the Großer Bratschenkopfs runs the climbing route known as Freier als Paul Preuß by Albert Precht (first climb, 1986, free solo, grade VII, face height 900 metres).

Literature 
 
 Albert Precht: Alpenvereinsführer Hochkönig. 1st edition, Bergverlag Rother, Munich, 1989, .
 Freier als Paul Preuß. In: Adi Stocker: Longlines – Die ganz großen Klettereien der Nördlichen Kalkalpen. Panico-Alpinverlag, Köngen, 2014, pp. 160–164 (PDF).

Mountains of the Alps
Mountains of Salzburg (state)
Berchtesgaden Alps
Two-thousanders of Austria